Campania was a small protected cruiser built for the Italian Regia Marina (Royal Navy) in the 1910s. Designed for colonial service, the ship was armed with a comparatively heavy armament on a small hull, with a long cruising radius emphasized over high speed. Commissioned into service in early 1917, Campania spent the first few years of her career in Italy's colonies, before being classified as a gunboat in 1921 and a training ship in 1932. This service lasted until 1937 when she was sold for scrapping.

Design

Her propulsion system consisted of a pair of vertical triple-expansion steam engines each driving a single screw propeller. Steam was supplied by four coal-fired, cylindrical fire-tube boilers that were vented into a single funnel. She had a crew of 11 officers and 193 enlisted men.

Campania was armed with a main battery of six  L/40 guns mounted singly; one was placed on the forecastle, one at the stern, and two on each broadside in sponsons on the main deck. She was also equipped with two  L40 guns, three 76 mm L/40 guns in anti-aircraft mountings, two  guns, and a pair of machine guns.

Service history
Campania was built by the Castellammare shipyard, where her keel was laid on 9 August 1913, the same day as Basilicata. The ships were small enough that they could be built on the same slipway. They were launched less than a year later on 23 July 1914. After fitting-out work was completed, Campannia was commissioned on 18 May 1917, four months before her sister ship.

Designed as a colonial cruiser in the mold of the cruiser , Campania spent the first several years of her career in Italy's African colonies, including Italian Libya. On 1 July 1921, the ship was reclassified as a gunboat and two of her 152 mm guns were removed during reconstruction work that lasted until 1922. Starting in 1932 she served as a school ship for naval cadets. She was capable of carrying 100 cadets, along with their officers, petty officers, and support staff. She remained in this role until she was stricken from the naval register on 11 March 1937 and sold for scrapping.

Notes

References

External links
 Campania Marina Militare website 

Campania-class cruisers
Ships built in Castellammare di Stabia
1914 ships